The bluntnosed sawtooth pellonuline, Potamothrissa obtusirostris is a fish species in the family Clupeidae. It is native to Central African Republic, Democratic Republic of the Congo and Republic of the Congo. The International Union for Conservation of Nature classifies this species as Least concern.

References

Fish described in 1909
Clupeidae